The fifth season of Teenage Mutant Ninja Turtles aired in 1991. First being located on the Volcanic Asteroid in Dimension X where it remained throughout season 4, for most of this season, the Technodrome is frozen at the North Pole. The transport modules from season 3 are reused, this time to drill underneath Canada and into New York City.

Episodes #119 and #120 originally ran as a 1-hour prime-time special titled "Planet Of The Turtleoids". When reran, it was split into two parts.

Episodes
 All twenty fifth-season episodes were directed by Fred Wolf.

Notes 

"Planet Of The Turtleoids" is included in the season 10 DVD as a bonus episode uncut as well as "Once Upon A Time Machine"

References

External links
TV Com

Teenage Mutant Ninja Turtles (1987 TV series) seasons
1991 American television seasons
Television shows set in the Arctic
Time travel in television
Florida in fiction
Fiction set in 2036
Fiction about comets
Tokyo in fiction
Television series set in the 2030s
Tokyo Metropolitan Police Department in fiction
Fiction set around Polaris